Paul Joseph Nussbaum, C.P. (September 7, 1870 – June 24, 1935) was an American prelate of the Roman Catholic Church. He served as bishop of the Diocese of Corpus Christi in Texas (1913–1920) and as bishop of the Diocese of Sault Sainte Marie-Marquette in Michigan (1922–1935). 

Nussbaum was the first member of the Congregation of the Passion of Jesus Christ (Passionist) to be appointed bishop in the United States.

Biography

Early life 
Henry Nussbaum was born on September 7, 1870, in Philadelphia, Pennsylvania, to Bernard and Louise (née Erne) Nussbaum. Orphaned at a young age, he was raised by relatives. He made his profession as a member of the Congregation of the Passion on July 24, 1887, taking the religious name of Paul Joseph. Later that year, the Passionists sent him to Brazil as a missionary.

Priesthood 
Nussbaum was ordained to the priesthood for the Congregation of the Passion in Rio De Janeiro by Archbishop João Fernando Santiago Esberard on May 20, 1894.  the Passionists then sent him to Argentina as a missionary.  Nussbaum returned to the United States in 1904 to first serve as a curate in a parish in West Hoboken, New Jersey, then in Dunkirk, New York. From 1908 to 1913, Nussbaum was a consultor for St. Paul of the Cross Province.

Bishop of Corpus Christi 
On April 4, 1913, Nussbaum was appointed as the first bishop of the newly erected Diocese of Corpus Christi  by Pope Pius X. He received his episcopal consecration on May 20, 1913, from Archbishop Giovanni Bonzano, with Bishops John O'Connor and Charles McDonnell serving as co-consecrators, in West Hoboken. He was the first Passionist to be appointed bishop in the United States. Nussbaum was installed at Corpus Christi Cathedral on June 8, 1913. 

As bishop, Nussbaum founded St. Ann's Society for married women, and promoted the Forty Hours' Devotion and daily communion. He also emphasized Catholic education and doubled the number of parochial schools in the diocese. In 1918, Nussbaum was seriously injured in a train accident from which he never fully recovered.  During his tenure, he welcomed into the diocese many Mexican priests and nuns who were forced to flee Mexico due to the Mexican Revolution.  He set up Duns Scots College in Hebbronville, Texas, to train seminarians for future service in Mexico. 

On March 26, 1920, Pope Pius XI accepted Nussbaum's resignation for health reasons as bishop of the Diocese of Corpus Christi;  the pope then named him titular bishop of Gerasa. Nussbaum then returned to St. Michael's Monastery in West Hoboken as a faculty member for seminarians.

Bishop of Sault Sainte Marie and Marquette 
Following the resignation of Bishop Frederick Eis, Nussbaum was appointed the fifth bishop of the Diocese of Sault Sainte Marie-Marquette on November 14, 1922.

Death and legacy 
Paul Nussbaum died from a stroke on June 24, 1935, at St. Mary's Hospital in Marquette at age 64.  He was buried in West Hoboken. His remains were transferred to Corpus Christi Cathedral in 1985 by Bishop Rene H. Gracida.

References

External links
Roman Catholic Diocese of Corpus Christi
Roman Catholic Diocese Of Marquette

Episcopal succession

1870 births
1935 deaths
20th-century Roman Catholic bishops in the United States
Passionist bishops
People from Corpus Christi, Texas
Clergy from Philadelphia
Roman Catholic bishops of Marquette
Catholics from Texas